Arta epicoenalis is a species of snout moth in the genus Arta. It was described by Ragonot, in 1891, and is known from the United States, where it is found from California to Texas and Oklahoma.

References

Chrysauginae
Moths of North America
Fauna of the Southwestern United States
Fauna of California
Moths described in 1891